Richard Douglas "Rick" Earley (born August 3, 1944) is an American former diver who competed in the 1972 Summer Olympics. He was born in Redlands, California. In 1991, Earley was inducted into the Fresno County Athletic Hall of Fame.

References

1944 births
Living people
Olympic divers of the United States
Divers at the 1972 Summer Olympics
Pan American Games medalists in diving
Pan American Games gold medalists for the United States
Divers at the 1971 Pan American Games
Medalists at the 1971 Pan American Games